, commonly:  is a Shinto shrine located in the Ichinomiya neighborhood of the city of Takayama, Gifu Prefecture, Japan.  It is the ichinomiya of the former Hida Province. The main festival of the shrine is held annually on May 2.

Enshrined kami
The primary kami enshrined at Minashi Jinja is:
 , the god of the year.
Beppyo shrines

History
There are no official records marking the construction of the shrine; however, during the reign of Emperor Seiwa (858–878), the shrine appears in official records and was given Junior Fourth Rank, Upper Grade court rank. The shrine is listed in the Engishiki records. During the Kamakura period, it was referred toes the "Minashi Dai-gongen" and in the Muromachi period as the "Minashi Myōjin" or the "Minashi Hachiman". During the Meiji period era of State Shinto, the shrine was designated as a  under the Modern system of ranked Shinto Shrines from 1871. From 1874 to 1877, Shimazaki Masaki, the father of author Shimazaki Tōson and model for the main character of his seminal work Before the Dawn was the kannushi of this shrine.

Because of the bombing of Nagoya in World War II, Minashi Shrine served as a refuge for Atsuta Shrine's Kusanagi from August 21 to September 19, 1945.

The shrine is located an eight-minute walk from Hida-Ichinomiya Station on the JR Central Takayama Main Line.

Gallery

See also
List of Shinto shrines
Ichinomiya

References
 Plutschow, Herbe. Matsuri: The Festivals of Japan. RoutledgeCurzon (1996) 
 Ponsonby-Fane, Richard Arthur Brabazon. (1959).  The Imperial House of Japan. Kyoto: Ponsonby Memorial Society. OCLC 194887

External links

Notes

Shinto shrines in Gifu Prefecture
9th-century establishments in Japan
Takayama, Gifu
Hida Province